George David Dobson (born 15 November 1997) is an English footballer who plays as a midfielder for Charlton Athletic. He is a versatile player who can play as a defensive midfielder or as a centre-back, having mainly played as the latter as a youth player.

Early life
Dobson attended Brentwood School in Essex between 2009 and 2014 until the age of 16. This is the same school as retired international footballer Frank Lampard.

Club career
Dobson started his career as a youth player at Arsenal aged 8 before joining West Ham on 28 July 2015. Dobson, aged 17 at the time, was placed straight into the club's U21 side and played frequently during the 2015–16 season. At Arsenal, Dobson was played as a centre-back. However, much to the player's delight, West Ham trained him into a central midfielder, often playing in a holding or defensive role. He is a boyhood West Ham United fan and this helped in the decision of joining the club in 2015.

On 29 June 2016, Dobson signed for League One side Walsall on a season-long loan. He made his debut in the EFL Cup in a 2–0 home defeat to Yeovil Town. He started the match before being substituted on the 69th minute. His league debut came on 16 August when he started the match in a 0–2 defeat at Chesterfield.

On 16 July 2017, it was announced Dobson had signed for Eredivisie side Sparta Rotterdam for an undisclosed fee. He re-joined Walsall on a two-and-a-half-year contract during the 2017–18 January transfer window.

On 25 July 2019, Dobson signed for Sunderland on a three-year deal. He scored his first goal for Sunderland in an EFL Cup tie against Burnley on 28 August 2019.

In the 2020-21 season, Dobson had become a fringe figure at Sunderland, starting only three league games. Despite being unhappy at his lack of gametime, he reportedly turned down potential moves away from the club, until on 22 January 2021, when it was announced that Dobson had joined League One side AFC Wimbledon on loan for the remainder of the season. He scored his first goal for Wimbledon in a 1-1 draw with Wigan Athletic on 16 March 2021.

Dobson joined Charlton Athletic on 1 July 2021, signing a two-year deal with the club. In December 2022, following the appointment of Dean Holden as manager, Dobson was given the captaincy to take over from Jayden Stockley.

Career statistics

Honours

Individual
Charlton Athletic Player of the Year: 2021–22

References

External links

George Dobson's official Instagram

Living people
1997 births
West Ham United F.C. players
Association football midfielders
Arsenal F.C. players
Walsall F.C. players
English footballers
Footballers from Romford
People from Harold Wood
English Football League players
Sparta Rotterdam players
Expatriate footballers in the Netherlands
English expatriate footballers
Eredivisie players
Tweede Divisie players
Sunderland A.F.C. players
AFC Wimbledon players
Charlton Athletic F.C. players